Superior Beings is a BBC Books original novel written by Nick Walters and based on the long-running British science fiction television series Doctor Who. It features the Fifth Doctor and Peri.

Plot synopsis
Peri hasn't been traveling with the Doctor for long and is charmed by the exciting life he leads. This soon turns to terror as a pleasure planet the pair visits turns out to be the domain of hunters who enjoy the taste of human flesh.

That's not even the worst of the secrets the place holds.

External links
The Cloister Library - Superior Beings

2001 British novels
2001 science fiction novels
Past Doctor Adventures
Fifth Doctor novels
British science fiction novels
Novels by Nick Walters
Novels set on fictional planets